Salma Hage (born 8 January 1942) is a Lebanese author and cook. She is the author of the bestselling cookbook The Lebanese Kitchen. Her second book The Middle Eastern Vegetarian Cookbook won her the James Beard Award in the Vegetable Cooking category.

Early life
Hage was born in Mazraat El Toufah in northern Lebanon in 1942. Her father was a Maronite priest, and she was the eldest of 12 children, learning cookery skills from her grandmother.

Life in the UK
In 1967 she moved with her family to Wimbledon in south London, UK. She worked as a Kitchen Hand in her mid-twenties, then worked her way up to the role of Head Chef for a large catering organisation, learning to appreciate English cuisine while bringing the flavours of home, of Lebanon, to share with others wherever she cooked. Salma and her husband continue to visit Lebanon every year and remain deeply connected to their roots.

The Lebanese Kitchen
In 2012 Salma wrote The Lebanese Kitchen for Phaidon Press. A definitive guide to traditional cuisine from Lebanon, the cookery book contains more than five hundred of her recipes from her fifty years’ experience of cooking, ranging from light, tempting mezzes to rich and hearty main courses.

The Middle Eastern Vegetarian Cookbook 
The second cookbook followed in 2016 with one hundred and fifty new recipes in line with the current Western trends of consciously reducing meat, and the ancient Middle Eastern culture of largely vegetarian, mezze style dining. Salma incorporates some new ingredients too, creating a modern approach to authentic Lebanese food with many options for Vegan and Gluten free diets. Michelin chef Alain Ducasse authored the foreword for this prequel which later won great acclaim including recognition as the James Beard Award Winner in 2017, in the Vegetable Cooking category.

Awards
2016 James Beard Award ‘Vegetable Cooking’ for The Middle Eastern Vegetarian Cookbook.

Works
Hage, Salma (2018). The Middle Eastern Mezze Cookbook. London: Phaidon Press, 

Hage, Salma (2016). The Middle Eastern Vegetarian Cookbook. London: Phaidon Press, 

Hage, Salma (2012). The Lebanese Kitchen. London: Phaidon Press,

References

External links
 

1942 births
Lebanese chefs
Lebanese Maronites
Living people
People from Zgharta District
Vegetarian cookbook writers
Women chefs